KJOI-LP is an adult standards and soft AC formatted broadcast radio station licensed to and serving Biola, California.

KJOI is owned and operated by Western Educational Alliance, Inc. (WEA), a non-commercial, non-profit 501c3 organization that broadcasts commercial-free, family-safe programming with limited interruptions. KJOI's mix of nostalgia and adult standard programming features more than 100 hit artists and 2000+ billboard chart songs spanning four decades. KJOI's programming is occasionally interrupted with community sponsored public service announcements (PSAs), sponsor supported greetings and pledge drives to help support their ad-free format.

At its helm, is WEA's founder and president, Jim Zahn.  Jim has a long history of television broadcasting excellence and has played a key role in launching multiple stations in the Central San Joaquin Valley.

References

External links
K-Joy Online

2015 establishments in California
Adult standards radio stations in the United States
Classic hits radio stations in the United States
Oldies radio stations in the United States
Radio stations established in 2015
JOI-LP
JOI-LP